Mark Skaife  (born 3 April 1967) is a retired Australian motor racing driver. Skaife is a five-time champion of the V8 Supercar Championship Series, including its predecessor, the Australian Touring Car Championship, as well as a six-time Bathurst 1000 winner. On 29 October 2008, he announced his retirement from full-time touring car racing. Since retiring from driving, Skaife has worked as a commentator and presenter for the series for both the Seven Network and Fox Sports Australia.

In 2022, it was revealed that he is the Director of Motorsport for design and engineering consultancy - IEDM, which oversaw the reconfiguration of Albert Park Circuit.

Biography

Skaife was born in Gosford, New South Wales, the son of touring car racer, Russell Skaife. Skaife is married to his second wife Toni and has three children: Mitch, Mia and Tilly – Mitch born from his first wife Belinda. He attended Wyong High School and is a known supporter of National Rugby League club the Manly-Warringah Sea Eagles.

In 2004, he was awarded the Medal of the Order of Australia, for services to motor racing and charity. In 2006, Skaife set a Guinness World Record with the fastest speed of 277.16 km/h (172.21 mp/h) for a production ute, driving a HSV Maloo at the Woomera Prohibited Area.

Racing career

Early years
Skaife began racing karts in the 1980s in his native New South Wales, before moving to Melbourne to complete his apprenticeship under Fred Gibson. His first car race was at Amaroo Park in 1984, at the wheel of a Holden Torana XU-1 sports sedan, which was partly built by his father, Russell. In 1985 Skaife joined the NSW Ford Laser Series, finishing second in the series. Skaife again finished runner up in the 1986 NSW Laser Series and winning the Victorian Series of the same year. Skaife was due to compete in his maiden race at Bathurst in 1986, however his co-driver and team owner, Peter Williamson, crashed the team's Toyota Celica Supra MA61 at close to  during practice with Williamson suffering a broken jaw in the crash due to the cars onboard fire extinguisher breaking free of its mountings and hitting the veteran Sydney driver in the mouth (Williamson wore an open face helmet). Subsequently, with Williamson confined to a hospital bed in Bathurst and the Supra in need of major repair, the entry was withdrawn.

In 1987 Skaife won the Australian 2.0 Litre Touring Car Championship in a Gibson Motorsport prepared Nissan Gazelle, before finishing 19th on Bathurst 1000 debut in same car (co-driven by Grant Jarret). The Bathurst result was somewhat controversial due to some alleged cheating during final qualifying. In 1987 Bathurst had become a round of the inaugural World Touring Car Championship and under the FIA's rules, all drivers had to qualify within 110% of the fastest time in their class and within 130% of the fastest overall time. Due to the different class structure of the WTCC compared to the ATCC, the Gazelle was in Class 2 against the BMW M3 and Alfa Romeo 75 (instead of against the 1.6 L Toyota Corolla's) and during Friday qualifying Jarret had been struggling to post the required time and it looked like the car would be a non-qualifier. After struggling for speed, during the morning session Jarret suddenly found the pace required and managed to easily qualify for the race. However, it was alleged that it had actually been Skaife, dressed in Jarret's race suit and wearing his helmet, who had actually set the time with some pointing to the fact that Skaife was nowhere to be seen in the pits when Jarret allegedly set his qualifying time (after returning to the pits the car was driven straight into the Nissan team garage in the pit paddock with the door immediately closed which only fueled the speculation). Nissan team boss Fred Gibson refuted these claims at the time but years later admitted that Skaife had indeed qualified the car as Jarret. Ironically Jarret's fastest race lap in the Gazelle (2:38.71) was actually faster than the qualifying time Skaife had set posing as Jarret (2:38.94).

During 1988 Skaife appeared at selected touring car events in Gibson's factory Nissan squad driving the Group A Nissan Skyline HR31 GTS-R. He failed to finish both the Sandown 500 (diff failure when Skaife was leading on lap 94 of 129) and Bathurst 1000 alongside George Fury (the Skyline, with Fury at the wheel, had lost its fan belt at full speed on Conrod Straight instantly cooking the turbocharged engine on just lap 17).

In 1989 Skaife made four ATCC starts as third driver in the Gibson Nissan team, starring in the wet at Winton on the way to fifth place. He paired with Jim Richards for endurance races, winning Sandown 500 before taking his first Bathurst 1000 podium in the Group A Nissan Skyline HR31 with third place.

Between 1991 and 1993 Skaife won 3 consecutive Australian Drivers Championships (ADC), earning 3 CAMS Gold Stars. In 1991& 1992 he was driving the Spa 003, switching to the Lola T91/50 for 1993 each run by Gibson Motorsport.

Australian Touring Car Championship ATCC (1990–2001)

1990 – Graduates to full-time drive with Nissan team following retirement of Fury. Finishes 14th in ATCC having switched from HR31 to R32 GT-R model Skyline midseason. Finishes 18th at Bathurst alongside Richards having suffered mechanical problems. Sustains back injury after rolling GT-R in Australian Grand Prix support race.

1991 – Wins three ATCC rounds, including his maiden victory at Round 3 at Wanneroo, WA. Skaife scores more points than any other driver during the season, but loses title to Jim Richards under drop-worst-round rules. Takes dominant Bathurst 1000 win (with Richards) in record total time, in the Nissan GT-R R32, which was the first Japanese car to win Bathurst.  Also records a Bathurst DNF after driving the team's second car late in the race under cross-entering rules.

1992 – Wins four ATCC rounds on his way to the championship. Takes second Bathurst 1000 win with the GT-R R32 as the race was red flagged due to wet conditions.

1993 – Stays with Gibson team during switch from Nissan GT-R R32 to Holden Commodore VP under new Group 3A rules. Finishes sixth in ATCC after failing to win a round. Takes second at Bathurst alongside Richards following a race-long duel with eventual winners Larry Perkins and Gregg Hansford.  Competes in FIA Touring Car World Cup at Monza with Nissan Castrol Racing, finishing 35th.

1994 – Wins four rounds (including first three in succession) on his way to a second ATCC title. Finishes second (with Richards) in first Sandown 500 start in five years. Crashes out early in wet conditions at Bathurst.

1995 – Misses opening ATCC round after enormous pre-season testing crash ahead of the Winfield Triple Challenge at Eastern Creek. Eventually finishes sixth in points standings with one round win driving the Holden Commodore VR. Leads Bathurst 1000 comfortably before mechanical trouble strikes nearing half distance.

1996 – Gibson team scales down to one car for ATCC following end of tobacco advertising. Finishes ninth in points with best round result of third. Records 13th in Sandown 500 (with Gary Waldon and Mark Noske) and seventh at Bathurst (with John Cleland).

1997 – Competes in just five of 10 ATCC rounds in the Holden Commodore VS as funding issues continue at Gibson team. Ends season 13th after best round result of third. Drives Lister Storm alongside Julian Bailey and Tommy Erdos in Le Mans 24 Hours, but fails to finish following mechanical issues. Makes first appearance with Mobil Holden Racing Team driving alongside Peter Brock in Sandown 500, scoring pole and finishing 12th. Again on pole at Bathurst but retires from the race while leading.

1998 – First full season with HRT, signed to replace Peter Brock, finishing third in ATCC without winning a round. Teams with Craig Lowndes in new VT model Commodore at Sandown to finish second. Pair show dominant form at Bathurst but finish just sixth after tyre issues.

1999 – Wins six rounds of Shell Championship Series (the most of any driver) but again finishes third in points in the Holden Commodore VT. Teams with Paul Morris for endurance races, recording 22nd in new Queensland 500 event (after being delayed by accident damage) and third at Bathurst.

2000 – Wins four rounds, including Clipsal 500 Adelaide and Queensland 500, on way to Shell Championship Series title. Seals championship with sixth place alongside Craig Lowndes in Bathurst finale.

2001 – Takes four round wins, including the Bathurst 1000 alongside Tony Longhurst, to claim Shell Championship Series title. Secures crown at penultimate event in Pukekohe – the first championship round to be held outside of Australia, driving the Holden Commodore VX.

V8 Supercars Championship Series (2002–2008)

2002 – Enjoys dominant V8 Supercars Championship Series victory in the Holden Commodore VX, having won seven of the 13 rounds, including the first five in succession. Season highlights also include a fourth triumph in the Bathurst 1000, partnered by former teammate Jim Richards, and a second Clipsal 500 trophy.

2003 – Wins Clipsal 500 and Sandown 500 (alongside Todd Kelly) on his way to third in the championship in the Holden Commodore VY. Announced as new owner of Holden Racing Team mid-season following earlier collapse of founding owner Tom Walkinshaw Racing. Finishes eighth at Bathurst alongside Todd Kelly after late-race mechanical black flag for loose bodywork while running second.  At the final race of the season at Eastern Creek Skaife and Russell Ingall were involved in a race incident in which both drivers were later fined by race officials. Both drivers also had points deducted, which left Skaife finishing the year in sixth place in the championship.

2004 – Fails to win a championship round for the first time in six years. Finishes season 12th in points with a best round result of second at Oran Park. Out of contention early at Bathurst with mechanical trouble (teamed with Todd Kelly).

2005 – Wins fifth Bathurst 1000 crown driving the Holden Commodore VZ, this time teamed with Todd Kelly. Records fifth place in V8 Supercars Championship Series.

2006 – Finishes only 16th in V8 Supercars Championship Series despite seven wins. Crashes out of Bathurst 1000 on opening lap after enduring mechanical issues while starting from pole position (teamed with Garth Tander).

2007 – Records eighth in V8 Supercars Championship Series with one round win, driving the Holden Commodore VE – finishing behind teammate Kelly in the standings for the fourth consecutive year. Misses Sandown 500 due to appendix surgery before crashing out of Bathurst 1000 in closing stages. Transfers partial ownership of HRT back to Tom Walkinshaw. Skaife reached 200 championship round starts in the final event of 2007.

2008 – Joined at HRT by the then reigning champion Garth Tander. Wins L&H 500 at Phillip Island alongside Garth Tander. Finishes 12th in Bathurst 1000 after mid-race crash. Confirms 2008 will be final season as full-time driver following Gold Coast event. Ends season 14th in points with a 27th place round result in Oran Park finale. Announces sale of remainder of HRT to Walkinshaw.

V8 Supercars Championship Series – Endurance Races (2009–2011)

Following Skaife's retirement from full-time driving, he announced that he would compete in the V8 Supercars endurance races for 2009, an arrangement that he continued into 2010 and 2011. This was a highly successful venture which gave Skaife further wins at Philip Island in 2010 & 2011 and his final Bathurst victory in 2010.

2009 –  Skaife teams with Greg Murphy at Tasman Motorsport for endurance races, finishing 11th in Phillip Island 500 and fourth in Bathurst 1000.

2010 –  Skaife joins TeamVodafone to win Phillip Island 500 and Bathurst 1000 alongside Craig Lowndes.

2011 – Skaife continues as an endurance-only driver in V8 Supercars Championship for third consecutive year. Teams with Lowndes to score second consecutive Phillip Island 500 victory before placing second in Bathurst 1000. Skaife announced on 17 October 2011, that he will retire as an endurance racer in order to take up the role as Chairman of the newly formed V8 Supercars Commission.

Mark Skaife ends his driving career with 482 race starts, 90 race wins, 42 event wins, 41 pole positions and 5 drivers championships.

Media career

Skaife joined the Seven Network following his full-time retirement. He became a co-commentator for the V8 Supercars series alongside Neil Crompton and Matthew White, continuing in this position until Seven lost the rights after the 2014 season. In 2015, with the broadcast rights moving to a shared deal between Fox Sports and Network Ten, Skaife joined Fox Sports. He took on a presenter role, without commentating, and also co-hosted their V8 Supercars television series ‘’Inside Supercars’’. From 2016, Skaife returned to the commentary box as a commentator, whilst retaining his presenting roles at Fox Sports.
Skaife has four books published to as of 2020:
 Diary of a Champion (2002)
 The Racing Years (2009)
 Life In The Fastlane (2010)
 The Complete Illustrated Autobiography (2020)

Career results

Complete World Touring Car Championship results
(key) (Races in bold indicate pole position) (Races in italics indicate fastest lap)

Complete International Formula 3000 results
(key) (Races in bold indicate pole position; races in italics indicate fastest lap.)

Supercars Championship results
(Races in bold indicate pole position) (Races in italics indicate fastest lap)

Complete Bathurst 1000 results

Complete Sandown endurance results

Complete 24 Hours of Le Mans results

Complete Bathurst 12 Hour results

References

 "Farewell Skaifey", 2008 NRMA Motoring & Services Gran Finale official race programme

External links
 Official Mark Skaife Website
 MotorSM.com – Mark Skaife
 

Supercars Championship drivers
1967 births
Living people
Holden people
International Formula 3000 drivers
Australian Touring Car Championship drivers
Bathurst 1000 winners
Australian television presenters
Motorsport announcers
Formula Holden drivers
24 Hours of Le Mans drivers
Racing drivers from Sydney
People from Gosford
Recipients of the Medal of the Order of Australia
Australian Endurance Championship drivers
BMW M drivers